DTR may refer to:

Technology
 Data Terminal Ready, a control signal in RS-232 serial communications
 Desktop replacement computer, portable, with desktop-like capabilities
 Digital Tape Recorder in spacecraft of the Voyager program

Others
 The Deuteronomist historian (Dtr)
 Dietetic Technician, Registered
 Dorian Thompson-Robinson (born 1999), American football player
 Downtown Radio, Northern Ireland